{ "type": "ExternalData", "service": "page", "title": "Western Australian region - Goldfields-Esperance.map" }

The Goldfields–Esperance region is one of the nine regions of Western Australia. It is located in the south eastern corner of Western Australia, and comprises the local government areas of Coolgardie, Dundas, Esperance, Kalgoorlie–Boulder, Laverton, Leonora, Menzies, Ngaanyatjarraku, Ravensthorpe and Wiluna.

It also incorporates the area along the Great Australian Bight to the South Australian border known as the Nullarbor Plain.

Geography
It is mostly a low and flat plateau of extremely ancient Precambrian rocks that have been stable since long before the Paleozoic Era. Because of the extreme geological stability and the absence of glaciation since the Carboniferous, the soils are extremely infertile and generally quite saline. Consequently, the region supports the lowest stocking rates in the world: it is considered that one sheep per square mile is the maximum sustainable rate except in the small wetter area near Esperance. There are no rivers; any rainfall that is not absorbed by the dense rooting systems of the native flora percolates to form extremely saline groundwater, which is very frequently too salty even for adult sheep.

The Little Sandy Desert and the Gibson Desert are found in the northern part of the region, with the Great Victoria Desert in the south east.

Climate
The climate is mostly hot and dry. Most rainfall is produced by thunderstorms in spring or summer or by cloudbands from the northwest in autumn and winter, but sometimes cyclones from the Pilbara decay into rain depressions and produce heavy rainfall. Climate change has already had a major impact: in the Kalgoorlie – Eucla – Wiluna – Giles area annual rainfall has increased by over 40 percent since 1967 – probably due to lower frequencies of anticyclones located over the interior of Australia instead of the adjacent oceans.

Population
It has a population of just under 60,000 people, about half of whom live in the City of Kalgoorlie-Boulder.  Another quarter live in the Shire of Esperance, and the remaining shires are very sparsely populated.  Nearly 10% of the region's population are of Aboriginal descent, which is substantially higher than the state as a whole.

Economy
The economy of the Goldfields sub-region is based on the extraction and processing of various mineral resources, primarily gold and nickel. In 2012 the mining of gold, nickel and platinum yielded just under A$9 billion.

Pastoralism in the northern goldfields commenced in the early 1900s with Yundamindera Station being established by Dr. Laver. Between 1925 and 1928  were established, and over £1,500,000 was invested in properties in the northern and eastern goldfields. In three months of 1925 over 40,000 sheep were railed to the area and in one month of 1927 seven trains carrying sheep arrived. By 1934 the goldfields were stocked with over 500,000 sheep and 25,000 cattle. Shearing the same year produced approximately 11,667 bales of wool valued at £243,600.

Further south near Esperance, the economy is based on agriculture, with wheat, canola and barley widely grown and making up about 80% of the area's agricultural economy. These crops require huge inputs of fertilisers because of the sandy nature of the soils and are a major threat to the region's great plant diversity. In 2021–22, the Esperance zone harvested 3,550,000 tonnes of grain. Pastoralism is also common, with both sheep and cattle stations being common in the area. Along the coast fishing and aquaculture are common, with fisheries for abalone, pilchards and sharks.

References

External links

 Goldfields–Esperance Development Commission

Regions of Western Australia
Goldfields-Esperance